Verkh-Kuchuk is a rural locality (a selo) and the administrative center of Verkh-Kuchuksky Selsoviet, Shelabolikhinsky District, Altai Krai, Russia. The population was 1,044 as of 2013. There are 12 streets.

Geography 
Verkh-Kuchuk is located 40 km west of Shelabolikha (the district's administrative centre) by road. Ivanovka is the nearest rural locality.

References 

Rural localities in Shelabolikhinsky District